Statistics of American Soccer League II in season 1941–42.

Metropolitan Division

New England Division

First half

Second half
After a two-week break for the American League Cup finals, the second half of the league season began on November 30. But, after two weeks of games, the league practically ground to a halt due to the Attack on Pearl Harbor and the U.S.'s entry into World War II. In addition, chaos seemed to rein as the league attempted to continue the competition through difficult times. The league complied with the Scandinavians request to replay the first half playoff game with St. Michael's in early February. The replay was not played and the league went on hold waiting for that and other games. The Swedes and Scans never returned to the league. On May 3, one more league game was played as the Celts beat St. Michael's 3-0.
Final official second half standings available on February 5. The Celts and St. Michael's played one more match on May 3 that is not included in these standings.

First Half Playoff
St. Michael's and Scandinavians ended the first half tied for first place. A playoff was held to determine the first half champions.

References

American Soccer League (1933–1983) seasons
Amer